Patrice Munsel (born Patrice Beverly Munsil; May 14, 1925 – August 4, 2016) was an American coloratura soprano. Nicknamed "Princess Pat", she was the youngest singer ever to star at the Metropolitan Opera.

Early years
An only child, Patrice Beverly Munsil (she later changed the spelling of her surname) was born and raised until age 15 in Spokane, Washington. Her father, Audley J. Munsil, was a local dentist. She attended Lewis and Clark High School before leaving at age fifteen, accompanied by her mother, to study in New York City, coached by Giacomo Spadoni (1884–1960).

Career
Munsel first sang at the Metropolitan at age 17 in March 1943. She made her official Metropolitan debut on December 4, 1943, aged 18, singing Philine in Mignon, for which she won popular praise but poor critical reviews. Her first opera contract was for three years at $40,000 per year; with other appearances she was making around $100,000 annually.

Perhaps best known for the roles of Adele in Die Fledermaus and Despina in Così fan tutte, Munsel sang 225 times at the Metropolitan Opera. Sir Rudolf Bing called her a "superb soubrette" and implied that she was the world's best. Her opera roles also included Rosina in The Barber of Seville and Gilda in Rigoletto.

Her husband Robert C. Schuler conceived and produced the ABC-TV primetime variety series The Patrice Munsel Show, which starred his wife, and was broadcast in the 1957–1958 season. Munsel appeared on many other TV shows during her career, including the role of Marietta (Countess d'Altena) in the January 15, 1955 live telecast of the operetta Naughty Marietta. She portrayed the title role in the 1953 film Melba, which chronicled the life of the great opera singer Dame Nellie Melba.

Munsel made frequent television appearances on The Bell Telephone Hour. She was the celebrity guest on the February 2, 1958 episode of the TV quiz show What’s My Line?. Munsel was the central singer in the Camp Fire Girls' famous TV commercial and song "Sing Around the Campfire (Join the Camp Fire Girls)", aired in the mid-1960s. A former Camp Fire Girl herself, she was also a spokeswoman for the organization.

Munsel made her final performance for the Metropolitan Opera on January 28, 1958, in the title role in La Périchole. She appeared on stage as a guest during the 1966 Gala Farewell to the old opera house at Broadway and 39th Street, despite never performing at the new met location on Lincoln center.  Munsel ended her career as an opera singer in 1981, and began to perform in musical comedies. She retired from performing in 2008.

Personal life
In 1952, Munsel married Robert C. Schuler, an advertising and public relations executive, producer, and writer. They were married for 55 years, until his death at age 90 in 2007, and had four children: Heidi (born 1953), Rhett (1955–2005), Scott (born 1958), and Nicole (born 1959). The younger two children were born prematurely. Munsel and Schuler co-wrote a 2005 memoir of Schuler's life entitled The Diva & I. Munsel died on August 4, 2016, at her home in Schroon Lake, New York, aged 91.

For a number of years, Munsel lived in Flower Hill, New York.

Selected discography
Selections from The King and I, following the official cast album with Gertrude Lawrence, Munsel was the second Anna on record, in a studio recording accompanied by Robert Merrill as the king, and supported by Dinah Shore and Tony Martin as the young lovers. Most of the album was accompanied by Henri René & His Orchestra 1952

Video
Texaco Star Theater television appearance (September 25, 1951), youtube.com 
Looking back: Patrice Munsel, spokesman.com, January 5, 2008
Video of January 31, 1958 episode at Internet Archive

References

External links
Patrice Munsel Collection at the Harry Ransom Center
Cover of Time magazine, December 3, 1951
Article in Time magazine, December 3, 1951
 Cover of Life magazine, March 3, 1952 
Metropolitan Opera's "Opera News Online"
[Archived 31 December 2017]

1925 births
2016 deaths
American operatic sopranos
Singers from Washington (state)
Musicians from Spokane, Washington
Flower Hill, New York
RCA Victor artists
Soubrettes
21st-century American singers
20th-century American women opera singers
Winners of the Metropolitan Opera Auditions of the Air
21st-century American women